is a Japanese magical-girl anime franchise by Ashi Productions. The original series ran between 1982 and 1983 on TV Tokyo and inspired three OVAs between 1985 and 1987. A second television series, titled , ran on NTV between 1991 and 1992, and like the original, it spawned home video follow-ups.

In 2006, series writer Takeshi Shudo expressed interest in making a third Momo anime series. In 2009, Ashi Productions, then known as Production Reed, announced a new Momo production, but it has not yet surfaced, likely due to Shudo's passing in 2010.

Media

First anime

Magical Princess Minky Momo is a Japanese anime television series produced by Ashi Productions that premiered on March 18, 1982 and concluded on May 26, 1983 on TV Tokyo after 63 episodes. The series inspired a crossover short film with Studio Pierrot's Creamy Mami, the Magic Angel called  that was released on June 15, 1985, attached to the latter's theatrical film. The following month, a Peter Pan themed OVA named  was released in Japan. On January 21, 1987 Ashi released the  animated music video.

Plot
Fenarinarsa is a dwelling place for fairy tale characters. It was in danger of leaving Earth's orbit and disappearing, because people on the planet lost their dreams and hopes. The king and queen of Fenarinarsa sent their daughter Momo to Earth to help the people regain them. Momo became the daughter of a young childless couple, accompanied by three followers with the appearance of a dog (Sindbook), a monkey (Mocha) and a bird (Pipil). On Earth, Momo takes the appearance of a teenage girl. To help the planet regain its hopes and dreams, Momo transforms into an adult version of herself, with an occupation tailored to fit the situation (airline stewardess, police officer, football manager, veterinarian, and many more). Each time Momo succeeds in bringing happiness to the person affected, the Fenarinarsa crown shines. When it shines four times, a jewel appears in the crown. Once twelve jewels appear, Fenarinarsa will return to Earth.

Later in the series, however, the task is left incomplete as she loses her magical powers and soon gets killed by an incoming truck. She is reincarnated as a baby, the real daughter of the couple on Earth. Now she has her own dream to realize. She also has a pink lizard named Kadzilla who helps her and her allies defeat an evil shadow who had been the source of the troubles of the people she had helped.

International releases
In 1984, Harmony Gold acquired the rights to the original Minky Momo series and repackaged it into the 52-episode The Magical World of Gigi. The English dubbed version was broadcast in Australia on Network Ten, Malaysia on RTM1 and RTM2, Singapore, Kuwait, Zimbabwe, Trinidad and Tobago, Indonesia, Kenya, Brunei and Israel. Gigi branded productions also aired in Brazil, China, the Netherlands, France, Italy, Spain, Mexico, Portugal, Saudi Arabia, Russia and the Philippines, in local languages.

Despite international distribution, North American audiences initially only received the 1985 OVA, Yume no naka no Rondo. The English dubbed release was produced by Harmony Gold and distributed on VHS by Celebrity Home Entertainment in 1987, titled Gigi and the Fountain of Youth. Rebecca Forstadt (under the pseudonym Reba West) played Gigi (Momo) in this dub. Jehan (Gigi) Agrama sang the title song in the English and Italian versions. Like most English language anime during its time, it was heavily edited, with an altered plot, rewritten dialogue, and a changed soundtrack (all of the original Japanese vocal songs were replaced with new English songs). In 2015, William Winckler Productions released Harmony Gold's English dub of the original series in 13 compilation films through Amazon Instant Video.

Second anime

A second television series, produced by Ashi Productions and sharing the same title as the original, premiered on NTV on October 2, 1991. Three additional episodes were later released on home video. This series inspired the 1993 OVA , and its followup the year after, . The two starred an older Momo who was no longer a magical girl.

Plot
The second series follows a similar story structure to the first, but stars a new cast. She's accompanied by Cookbook (dog), Lupipi (bird), and Charmo (monkey) and enjoyed a happy life on the ground. Similar to the previous series, she is adopted by a young childless couple who became her parents on the ground and she used her magic to bring happiness to many people.

Later on, Momo and her family become refugees. She understands that people have few hopes and dreams now. She eventually meets the Momo character from the first series and ultimately decides to save all the remaining hopes and dreams, using her magic against many social issues. Despite her efforts, all magic and fairy tale characters begin to disappear. The King and Queen of Marināsa decide to escape from the Earth. Momo stays behind to fulfill her parents' dream of having a child, believing that hopes and dreams are never really lost.

Impact and influence
While aimed at young girls with the goal of selling toys, the original series attracted a considerable number of older male fans and alongside Creamy Mami, the Magic Angel, is credited as one of the originators of the lolicon otaku subculture. Though this unintended audience allegedly disgusted Ashi Productions founder Sato Toshihiko, it helped the show gain a strong 10% viewer share, leading to its run being extended from 50 episodes to 63.

Episode 46 of the original series has become infamous due to its depiction of Momo dying after being hit by a truck carrying toys. In an issue of Japanese anime magazine OUT, series writer Takeshi Shudo explained that this was due to the toy sponsor Popy pulling their funding due to poor merchandise sales, despite strong ratings. Furious with this decision, Ashi Productions revolted and killed the character off at the end of the episode. While the character's death was only temporary, the sequence was seen as a trailblazer that allowed later magical-girl productions to deal with darker themes. The episode, alongside the last, later inspired a Japanese urban legend linking the series to natural disasters.

In 1993, Hiroshi Takada won JASRAC's International Award for his work on the first TV series.

The original series ranked 70th in TV Asahi's 2005 poll of the most popular anime.

Soundtracks

Singles
Mahou no Princess Minky Momo: Yume no Naka no Rondo (1985)
sung by Mariko Shiga, EP, Victor Entertainment, KV-3068
Mahou no Princess Minky Momo: Yumemiru Heart (1991)
(CD) STAR CHILD, KIDA 31
Mahou no Princess Minky Momo: Yume wo Dakishimete (1992)
(CD) STAR CHILD, KIDA 42
Mahou no Princess Minky Momo: LOVE CALL (1993)
(CD) STAR CHILD, 8SSX 69

Albums
Magical Princess Minky Momo: Yume no Naka no Rondo Ongakuhen (1985)
(LP) Victor Entertainment, JBX-25066
(CD) Victor Entertainment, VDR-1073
Magical Princess Minky Momo: Fenarinarsa Song Festival (1985)
(CD) Victor Entertainment, VDR-1085
BGM MANIAC LIBRARY 3 Mahou no Princess Minky Momo Mihappyou BGM Shuu (1986)
(LP) Victor Entertainment, JBX-7003
(Cassette) Victor Entertainment, VSK-20003
Mahou no Princess Minky Momo: DaBaDaBa DaBaDa (1992)
(CD) King Records KICA-79
Mahou no Princess Minky Momo: Yuki ga Yandara (1992)
(CD) King Records, KICA-109
Mahou no Princess Minky Momo: Utau Fairy Tale! (1992)
(CD) King Records, KICA-120
Mahou no Princess Minky Momo: LOVE STAGE (1993)
(CD) King Records, KICA-131
Mahou no Princess Minky Momo: Yume ni Kakeru Hashi (1993)
(CD) King Records, KICA-146
Mahou no Princess Minky Momo: Someday My Prince Will Come (1994)
(CD) Victor Entertainment, VICL-23060 (also released on LP)
Mahou no Princess Minky Momo: Tabidachi no Eki (1994)
(CD) King Records, KICA-196
Mahou no Princess Minky Momo: Someday My Prince Will Come TV/OVA (1994)
(CD) Victor Entertainment, VICL-23060
Dendō Twin Series Magical Princess Minky Momo TV-ban OVA-ban (1999)
(CD) Victor Entertainment, VICL-60419/20

Compilations
These albums have songs from multiple shows. The applicable tracks are in bold.
Emotion 20th Anniversary Theme Collection - OVA & Movie
(CD) Victor Entertainment, VICL-60938
Disc 1
Dallos no Theme (Horn Spectrum, from Dallos)
Yume no Naka no Rondo (Mariko Shiga, from La Ronde in My Dream)
Active Heart (Noriko Sakai, from Gunbuster)
Try Again... (Noriko Sakai, from Gunbuster)
The Winner (Miki Matsubara, from Mobile Suit Gundam 0083: Stardust Memory)
Magic (Jacob Wheeler, from Mobile Suit Gundam 0083: Stardust Memory)
Just Fallin' Love: Ikustu mo no Setsunai Yoru no Naka de (Ayako Udagawa, from Dominion)
Kaze no Tsubasa (Hitomi Mieno, from Haou Taikei Ryuu Knight: Adeu's Legend)
Point 1 (Yumiko Takahashi, from Haou Taikei Ryuu Knight: Adeu's Legend)
Toketeiku Yume no Hate ni (Yayoi Gotō, from Iria: Zeiram the Animation)
100mph no Yūki (Sakiko Tamagawa and Akiko Hiramatsu, from You're Under Arrest)
Arittake no Jōnetsu de (Sakiko Tamagawa and Akiko Hiramatsu, from You're Under Arrest)
After, in the Dark: Torch Song (Mai Yamane and Gabriela Robin, from Macross Plus)
Inori no Asa (Miwako Saitō, from Shamanic Princess)
Omoide no Mori (Miwako Saitō, from Shamanic Princess)
Future Shock (cherry, from Birdy the Mighty)

Disc 2
Ai, Oboete Imasu ka (long version) (Mari Iijima, from The Super Dimension Fortress Macross: Do You Remember Love?)
Tenshi no Enogu (Mari Iijima, from The Super Dimension Fortress Macross: Do You Remember Love?)
Akira no Theme (Geinoh Yamashirogumi, from Akira)
Voices (Akino Arai, from Macross Plus (movie edition))
Heart & Soul (Emilia with Basara Nekki, from Macross 7: The Galaxy Is Calling Me!)
In Yer Memory (Takkyū Ishino, from Memories)
Calling (Nitro, from You're Under Arrest: The Movie)
Tōi Kono Machi de (Naomi Kaitani, from Cardcaptor Sakura)
Ashita e no Melody (Chaka, from Cardcaptor Sakura)
Yubiwa (single version) (Maaya Sakamoto, from The Vision of Escaflowne)
Grace - Jinroh Main Theme - Omega (Hajime Mizoguchi, from Jin-Roh)
Ask DNA (The Seatbelts, from Cowboy Bebop: The Movie)

References

External links

 (62 main episodes, plus special episodes 46.5, 53.5 and 58.5)

Fairy Princess Minky Momo 1st at Production Reed's website
Fairy Princess Minky Momo - La ronde in my dream at Production Reed's website
Fairy Princess Minky Momo 2nd at Production Reed's website
Fairy Princess Minky Momo official website
Studio Live page (1991 TV series)

1982 anime television series debuts
1985 anime OVAs
1987 anime OVAs
1991 anime television series debuts
1993 anime OVAs
1994 anime OVAs
Animated television series about children
Anime with original screenplays
Ashi Productions
Bandai Visual
Japanese children's animated fantasy television series
Magical girl anime and manga
Nippon TV original programming
Television series about princesses
Television series about shapeshifting
TV Tokyo original programming